The men's tournament of the 2013 Canadian Senior Curling Championships was held from March 16 to 24 at the Silver Fox Curling & Yacht Club in Summerside, Prince Edward Island.

Qualifying round
Four associations did not automatically qualify to the championships, and participated in a qualifying round. Two qualification spots were awarded to the winners of the double knockout round, Nova Scotia and the Northwest Territories.

Teams
The teams are listed as follows:

Knockout brackets

Knockout results

First knockout
Thursday, March 14, 2:30 pm

Thursday, March 14, 7:00 pm

Second knockout
Thursday, March 14, 7:00 pm

Friday, March 15, 8:00 am

Teams
The teams are listed as follows:

Round robin standings
Final Round Robin Standings

Round robin results
All draw times are listed in Atlantic Daylight Time (UTC-3).

Draw 2
Saturday, March 16, 2:30 pm

Draw 4
Sunday, March 17, 10:00 am

Draw 5
Sunday, March 17, 2:30 pm

Draw 6
Sunday, March 17, 7:00 pm

Draw 7
Monday, March 18, 10:00 am

Draw 8
Monday, March 18, 2:30 pm

Draw 9
Monday, March 18, 7:00 pm

Draw 10
Tuesday, March 19, 10:00 am

Draw 11
Tuesday, March 19, 2:30 pm

Draw 12
Tuesday, March 19, 7:00 pm

Draw 13
Wednesday, March 20, 10:00 am

Draw 14
Wednesday, March 20, 2:30 pm

Draw 16
Thursday, March 21, 8:00 am

Draw 18
Thursday, March 21, 4:00 pm

Draw 20
Friday, March 22, 10:00 am

Draw 22
Friday, March 22, 7:00 pm

Tiebreaker
Saturday, March 23, 8:00 am

Playoffs

Semifinal
Saturday, March 23, 7:00 pm

Final
Sunday, March 24, 11:00 am

References

External links

Host committee website

2013, Men's tournament
2013 in Canadian curling
Sport in Summerside, Prince Edward Island
Curling competitions in Prince Edward Island
2013 in Prince Edward Island